The Mad Doctor may refer to:
The Mad Doctor (1933 film), a Mickey Mouse film
The Mad Doctor (1941 film), a film starring Basil Rathbone
The Mad Doctor (novel), a 1935 novel by F. J. Thwaites